The Azov Museum of History, Archaeology and Palaeontology in Azov, Rostov oblast, is one of the largest museums in the south of Russia, particularly notable for its palaeontological collection.

History 
The museum was first opened on 17 May 1917 by the efforts of Mikhail Aronovich Makarovskiy and the town's civic society, and displayed small items given by the local population (old coins, postage stamps, bullets and so on), but was destroyed shortly afterwards in the Russian Revolution. It was reopened in 1937 but the collections were lost during the occupation by German troops in World War II. After the war the local people tried to revive the museum, but to do so took until 1960.

The museum occupies the premises of the old town hall. It also administers the Powder Cellar Museum.

Exhibits 
The palaeontological collection is of particular note, containing, among other specimens, skeletons of deinotherium, woolly rhinoceros, elasmotherium and steppe bison. The museum also has two complete skeletons of steppe mammoths, a male and a female. The skeleton of the male was found on 11 December 1964 near Azov in Kagalnitsky sand pit and was brought to the museum, but since it did not did have a paleontological laboratory and restoration specialists, assistance in the preservation of bones was provided by the workers of the Zoological Institute of the Academy of Sciences of the USSR. Vadim Evgenevich Garutt was engaged in conservation work. Restoration and production of missing bones took about ten years. After the restoration, in 1980 the whole skeleton was returned transported to the museum. In 1999, also in the Kagalnitsky quarry, the skeleton of a female steppe mammoth was found and excavated, and is also displayed in the paleontological collection.

Gallery

References

Further reading
Музеи России (комплекс., ист., естественно-науч., техн., отраслевые): спpав. Ч. 4. М., 1993. p. 77
Richagova, E.: Из глубины веков…, in Азовская неделя, 26 March 2015, p. 10
Barannikova, A.: Музей для детей, in Город N. 23 December 2014, p. 44
Richagova, E.: Азовскому музею — 95, in Азовская неделя, 24 May 2012, pp. 1, 4
Zekrach, М.: Хранитель истории, in Приазовье, 23 May 2012, p. 12
Richagova, Е.: От городской управы до музея, in Азовская неделя, 18 May 2006, p. 1
Semyonova, S. V.: Азовская диковина, in Дон. временник, 2009, pp. 146—148
Felotova, Т. А.: Азов и его музей, in Там же., 2007, pp. 59-62
Boranova, G.: Визитная карточка Азова, in Приазовье, 16 May 2002, p. 4
Kravtsova, Е. Хранители древностей, in Новая азов. газ., 23 May 2002, p. 5
Visavskaya, I.: Музей открыл миру Азов, in Азовская неделя, 16 May 2002, p. 1
Gorvenko, А.: Азовский краеведческий, in Приазовье, 18 May 1996, p. 7
Dik, N.: Сокровища кочевников Евразии: об экспозиции музея-заповедника, in Азов, 2010, No. 3 (October), p. 12-13
Boranova, G.: Свидетель истории (история здания музея-заповедника), in Красное Приазовье, 14 August 1984
Visavskaya, I.: Музей открыл миру Азов, in Азовская неделя, 16 May 2002, p. 1

External links
Azov Museums website 
Museum.ru - M836 
Culture.ru - Institutes/11289

Azov
Museums in Rostov Oblast
Cultural heritage monuments of regional significance in Rostov Oblast